Jean Louis S. de la Croix was a French archer.  He competed at the 1908 Summer Olympics in London. De la Croix entered the men's Continental style event in 1908, taking 14th place with 177 points.

References

External links
 
 

Year of birth missing
Year of death missing
Archers at the 1908 Summer Olympics
Olympic archers of France
French male archers